"Angel Interceptor" is a song by Ash, released as the third single from their album 1977 on 9 October 1995. It was released as a single CD, a 7" vinyl, and as a cassette. The song was written by Rick McMurray and Tim Wheeler and produced by Owen Morris.

This song is meant to be one of the reasons Ash believed they needed a fourth, female member. Originally, the track's high-pitched backing vocals were performed by drummer Rick McMurray, but the band were unsatisfied with them. The title of the song is a reference to fictional aircraft featured in the 1960s sci-fi series Captain Scarlet and the Mysterons.

B-sides
"Angel Interceptor" was released with two B-sides. "5am Eternal" is thought to be one of Ash's stranger songs. It starts with wind-up toy noises, and consists of lyrics, with blurry vocals, centred on strange sound effects, with synthesizer effects as well.

"Gimme Some Truth" is a cover of the electro-pop version of the John Lennon song from his Imagine album, originally performed by John Lennon & the Plastic Ono Band.

The Japanese version of the single contained 5 B-sides: "Girl from Mars" and "Cantina Band" from the "Girl from Mars" single, "Kung Fu" and "Luther Ingo's Star Cruiser" from the "Kung Fu" single, and "Gimme Some Truth" from the "Angel Interceptor" single. The Japanese release was sold with picture sleeves, lyrics and an obi-strip.

Music video
The video for the song was directed by Ash themselves, who put a high level of input into the video. It mainly consists of them playing in a yellow room, and occasionally messing about with stuff in the room. References to angels and rockets are occasionally made, such as a silhouette of an angel on a book at the start, and Tim reads a book on astrophysics.

Release and reception
"Angel Interceptor" was quite successful for Ash, giving them their second top 20 hit, reaching number 14 on the UK Singles Chart. The single became Ash's second NME Single of the Week. The song can also be found on Ash's greatest hits collection, Intergalactic Sonic 7″s, and a live version of the song can be found on the Tokyo Blitz DVD.

Track listing
UK CD / 7" / Cassette
 "Angel Interceptor" (McMurray/Wheeler)
 "5am Eternal" (Wheeler)
 "Gimme Some Truth" (John Lennon)

Japanese CD
 "Angel Interceptor" (McMurray/Wheeler)
 "Girl from Mars" (Wheeler)
 "Kung Fu" (Wheeler)
 "Gimme Some Truth" (John Lennon)
"Cantina Band" (John Williams)
 "Luther Ingo's Star Cruiser" (Hamilton/Wheeler)

References

1995 songs
1995 singles
Ash (band) songs
Songs written by Tim Wheeler
Songs written by Rick McMurray
Infectious Records singles